The women's 50 metre butterfly S7 event at the 2018 Commonwealth Games was held on 5 April at the Gold Coast Aquatic Centre. Per Commonwealth Games regulations, as only four participants entered the event, only a gold and silver medal would be awarded.

Records
Prior to this competition, the existing world, Commonwealth and Games records were as follows:

Schedule
The schedule is as follows:

All times are Australian Eastern Standard Time (UTC+10)

Results

Heats

Final

References

Women's 50 metre butterfly S7
Common